Louis Fraser (1819 – c. 1883) was a British zoologist and collector. In his early years, Fraser was curator of the Museum of the Zoological Society of London.

Little is known about Fraser's early life. He was born in 1819 or 1820 and married Mary Ann Harrison on 17 February 1844. A son Oscar L. Fraser worked as an assistant in the Indian Museum at Calcutta around 1888. He worked for fourteen years at the museum of the Zoological Society of London. He worked with the anatomist Richard Owen on studies of the emu and rhea. He participated in the Niger expedition of 1841 as the African Civilization Society's scientist, with Allen and Thomson. He stayed on in Fernando Po and collected. Upon his return he became in charge of Lord Derby's collection at Knowsley Hall. In 1846 he was sent by Lord Derby to collect in north Africa. In 1848 he became conservator at Knowsley. He wrote Zoologica Typica, or figures of the new and rare animals and birds in the collection  of the Zoological Society of London, a lavishly illustrated large-sized book, published in 1849. In this book he described many new species of birds. In 1850, Fraser was appointed Consul of Quidah, Dahomey (now Benin), West Africa. Around 1857–1859, he collected birds and mammals in Ecuador for Philip Lutley Sclater of the Zoological Society of London, and the year after in California. Upon his return to London, he opened a shop in Regent Street, London, selling exotic birds. The last years of his life he spent in America.

Fraser wrote a Catalogue of the Knowsley Collections (1850) and described several new species including the Derbyan parakeet Psittacula derbiana named after his employer. A number of species and subspecies have been named in his honour, including Fraser's anole (Anolis fraseri), Fraser's ground snake (Liophis epinephelus fraseri), a centipede snake (Tantilla fraseri ), Fraser's eagle-owl (Bubo poensis), Fraser's warbler (Myiothlypis fraseri), and Fraser's musk shrew (Crocidura poensis).

References

External links

1810 births
1866 deaths
British zoologists
Taxon authorities
Zoological collectors
British ornithologists
British expatriates in Nigeria
British expatriates in Benin
British emigrants to the United States